Oreophryne kampeni is a species of frog in the family Microhylidae.
It is endemic to Papua New Guinea.
Its natural habitat is subtropical or tropical moist lowland forests.

References

kampeni
Amphibians of Papua New Guinea
Taxonomy articles created by Polbot
Amphibians described in 1934